The Council of Communication Associations is a non-profit organization established in 1995 as an umbrella entity for several learned societies in the field of communication studies. Its member societies include: 
 American Journalism Historians Association 
 Association for Business Communication
 Association for Education in Journalism and Mass Communication
 Association of Schools of Journalism and Mass Media 
 Black College Communication Association
 Broadcast Education Association
 International Communication Association
 National Association for Media Literacy Education

Prior member association included: 
 National Communication Association

CCA's Constitution states: 
"The purposes of the Council shall be to enhance the missions and to facilitate the activities of its member associations, to advocate for the welfare and promote the understanding and advancement of communication, domestically and internationally, as academic and professional fields."

Patrice Buzzanell et al. describe CCA as "an example of an umbrella association that serves regional, specifically North American, interests but that may serve much broader constituencies" 

In 2010, CCA established the Center for Intercultural Dialogue. "The Center approaches ICD at two levels: encouraging research on
the topic, but also bringing international scholars together in shared dialogue about their work"

References

External links
Council of Communication Associations
Center for Intercultural Dialogue
American Journalism Historians Association
Association for Business Communication
Association for Education in Journalism and Mass Communication
Association of Schools of Journalism and Mass Media
Black College Communication Association
Broadcast Education Association
International Communication Association
National Association for Media Literacy Education

Learned societies of the United States
Professional associations based in the United States
1995 establishments in the United States